121 teams entered the 1986 FIFA World Cup qualification rounds, competing for 24 places in the final tournament. Mexico, as the hosts, and Italy, as the defending champions, qualified automatically, leaving 22 spots open for competition. The draw took place on 7 December 1983 at Zürich, Switzerland.

The 24 spots available in the 1986 World Cup would be distributed among the continental zones as follows:
 Europe (UEFA): 13.5 places, 1 of them went to automatic qualifier Italy, while the other 12.5 places were contested by 32 teams. The winner of the 0.5 place would advance to the intercontinental play-offs (against a team from OFC).
 South America (CONMEBOL): 4 places, contested by 10 teams.
 North, Central America and Caribbean (CONCACAF): 2 places, 1 of them went to automatic qualifier Mexico, while the other 1 place was contested by 17 teams.
 Africa (CAF): 2 places, contested by 29 teams.
 Asia (AFC): 2 places, contested by 27 teams.
 Oceania (OFC): 0.5 place, contested by 4 teams (including Israel and Chinese Taipei). The winner of the 0.5 place would advance to the intercontinental play-offs (against a team from UEFA).

A total of 110 teams played at least one qualifying match. A total of 308 qualifying matches were played, and 801 goals were scored (an average of 2.60 per match).

Confederation qualification

AFC

Iraq and Korea Republic qualified.

CAF

Algeria and Morocco qualified.

CONCACAF

Canada qualified.

CONMEBOL

Group 1 – Argentina qualified. Peru and Colombia advanced to the CONMEBOL play-offs.
Group 2 – Uruguay qualified. Chile advanced to the CONMEBOL play-offs.
Group 3 – Brazil qualified. Paraguay advanced to the CONMEBOL play-offs.
Play-offs – Paraguay qualified over Chile, Colombia and Peru.

OFC

Australia advanced to the UEFA–OFC intercontinental play-off

UEFA

Group 1 – Poland qualified. Belgium advanced to the UEFA play-offs.
Group 2 – West Germany and Portugal qualified.
Group 3 – England and Northern Ireland qualified.
Group 4 – France and Bulgaria qualified.
Group 5 – Hungary qualified. Netherlands advanced to the UEFA play-offs.
Group 6 – Denmark and USSR qualified.
Group 7 – Spain qualified. Scotland advanced to the UEFA–OFC intercontinental play-off.
Play-offs – Belgium qualified over Netherlands.

Inter-confederation play-offs: UEFA v OFC

The two teams would play against each other on a home-and-away basis. The winner qualified for the 1986 FIFA World Cup.

Qualified teams

The following 24 teams qualified for the 1986 FIFA World Cup:

(h) – qualified automatically as hosts

(c) – qualified automatically as defending champions

Top goalscorers

8 goals
 Preben Elkjær

7 goals
 Jorge Orlando Aravena Plaza
 Lau Wing-Yip

6 goals
 Zhao Dayu
 Rainer Ernst

5 goals
 John Kosmina
 Dave Mitchell
 Bryan Robson
 Jose Roberto Figueroa
 Zahi Armeli
 Kazushi Kimura
 Fernando Gomes
 Oleh Protasov
 Bassam Jeridi

Notes

 West Germany lost a World Cup qualifying match for the first time on 16 October 1985, when they were defeated 0–1 by Portugal in Stuttgart, in what was their 37th World Cup qualifier (including games played by Germany before World War II). The other two losses that the (now-reunified) German team suffered in the competition also took place on home soil: 1–5 to England in Munich in 2001, and 1–2 to North Macedonia in Duisburg in 2021. With only three losses in over 100 games, Germany remains the team with by far the lowest loss ratio in the FIFA World Cup qualification.
 Scotland manager Jock Stein died during their qualifier at Wales, suffering a heart attack immediately after the Scots scored a late equaliser.
 Iraq qualified to their only World Cup up to date.

External links
 FIFA World Cup Official Site - 1986 World Cup Qualification 
 RSSSF - 1986 World Cup Qualification

 
Qualification
FIFA World Cup qualification